The Ukrainian Catholic Apostolic Exarchate of Belarus (or Belarus of the Ukrainians) was a short-lived (1940-42) Apostolic Exarchate (Eastern Catholic pre-diocesan jurisdiction) of the particular Ukrainian Greek Catholic Church sui iuris (Byzantine Rite in Ukrainian language) in the Soviet Belarus SSR.

History 
 Established 1940 as Apostolic Exarchate of Belarus, without direct Eastern Catholic precursor
suppressed in 1942, having had a single incumbent (Ukrainian Rite) :
 Father Antoni Niemancewicz (1940 – 1942), no other prelature.

Sources and external links 
 GCatholic

Apostolic exarchates
Former Eastern Catholic exarchates
Eastern Catholicism in Belarus
History of the Ukrainian Greek Catholic Church